Patrician  may refer to:

 Patrician (ancient Rome), the original aristocratic families of ancient Rome, and a synonym for "aristocratic" in modern English usage
 Patrician (post-Roman Europe), the governing elites of cities in parts of medieval and Early Modern Europe
 The adjective formed from Saint Patrick
 Youngstown Patricians, a former semi-professional football team based in Youngstown, Ohio, USA
 A member of the Argentine Regiment of Patricians
 The Patrician, an annual publication of the Princess Patricia's Canadian Light Infantry regiment
 Packard Patrician, a large luxury car during the 1950s
 Havelock Vetinari, the Patrician of Ankh-Morpork in Terry Pratchett's Discworld series
 The Patrician (video game), a series of historical trading simulation computer games

See also
 Patricius (disambiguation)